John Wiseman (by 1515 – January 1558), of Great Canfield, Essex, was an English Member of Parliament for Maldon in November 1554 and for East Grinstead in 1555.

References

1558 deaths
English MPs 1554–1555
People from Uttlesford (district)
Year of birth uncertain